Kirdyapkin is a Russian masculine surname; its feminine counterpart is Kirdyapkina. Notable people with the name include:
Anisya Kirdyapkina (born 1989), Russian race walker
Sergey Kirdyapkin (born 1980), Russian race walker, husband of Anisya

Russian-language surnames